Jai Tulunad is a Tulu organisation of Tulu people which works for growth of culture, language and script of Tulunad. The organisation was started in Mulki on Aug 10, 2014. It was registered on 10 Aug 2015. The organisation also teaches Tulu script for free in both mediums online and offline.

Presidents

Works 

 Campaign against the Abused Worshipping of divine spiritual energy (Bootharadhane/Daivaradhane)
The organization has fought against the abused worship of the divine spiritual energy (Daivaradhane/Bootharadhane) according to the law and creates awareness among the people about the actions taken against the abuse.

 Tulu as the official language of the state 
The organization has worked for many years towards recognition of the Tulu language as the state language. By creating awareness in social media, for the first time, #TuluOfficialinKA_KL twitter campaign got trended and reached up to 4 lakh tweets just in a day and got a sensational reach throughout the nation. The organization has also stressed the MLAs of Tulunad and Home Minister for the official recognition of Tulu.

 Constitutional recognition of Tulu language
Many awareness campaigns like #TuluTo8thSchedule were conducted in social medias and stressing the political leaders regarding the same were done by the organization.

 Teaching Tulu language
From past many years, Jai Tulunad has been teaching interested people, to speak Tulu with an intention that not only people from Tulunad, but also people from other places should learn to speak Tulu. Good news is that many people outside Tulunad are individually coming forward to learn Tulu.

 Tulu script classes
With an intention of teaching Tulu script to all Tuluvas, free online Tulu script classes were conducted during the time of covid pandemic and after the pandemic around 35 offline classes were conducted. Many requests for conducting script classes in the future days are also being received. Along with this, around 10000 people have registered online for learning Tulu script and more than 2000 people have already written script exams.

 Training Tulu script Teachers
The organisation has been teaching Tulu script from many years and from past one year, the organization has prepared more than 150 Tulu script teachers. The organization has successfully created a large number of platforms for teaching Tulu script throughout Tulunad.

 Tulu Baravu Font 
The organization has developed a Tulu Font called "Tulu Baravu". It was brought up so that people could type Tulu in their mobile and computer. This Baravu Font was prepared from the model of Tulu academy's Unicode script. This has enabled people to use Tulu script in many boards, banners, social media posters, invitation cards, and many other.

 "KOPPARIGE" Online Tulu Dictionary
On 2 July 2021 the organization released "KOPPARIGE", an online Tulu dictionary, so that people could search the meaning of some words, reuse the endangered Tulu words and grab their interest towards Tulu literature. In this dictionary, users can get the meaning along with the details of any Tulu word in English, Hindi, Malayalam, Tamil, Telugu and Kannada. The specialty of this dictionary is that the words are written in Tulu script and the pronunciation of each word is available in the form of recorded audio. This dictionary is one of the biggest achievements of Jai Tulunad (R) organization.

 Tulu Mandara Font

On 9 July 2021, the organization released a Tulu Font "Mandara". It was developed by Prahlad Tantry and launched by Udupi MLA Raghupathi Bhat.
 "GenaSiri" Tulu Transcriptor

On 2 July 2022,"GenaSiri",which will allow users to transcript from Kannada and Malayalam texts to Tulu was released. This was developed by Jnanesh Derlakatte and released through the organization.

See also 
 Tulu language
 Tulu Nadu
 Tulu Nadu state movement

References

External links 
 
 Kopparige Online Tulu Dictionary

Tulu Nadu